Leonard Joseph Okrie (July 16, 1923 – April 12, 2018) was an American catcher and coach in Major League Baseball. Born in Detroit, Okrie stood 6'2" (188 cm) tall, weighed 185 pounds (84 kg), and batted and threw right-handed.

Career as player and MLB coach
Okrie's playing career stretched from 1942 through 1957, with three seasons (1943–45) missed due to World War II service in the United States Navy. Drafted by the Washington Senators out of the Chicago Cubs farm system in November 1947, Okrie would spend only one full season (1950) in the Major Leagues as Washington's third-string catcher (behind Al Evans and Mickey Grasso). He spent parts of the 1948 and 1951 campaigns with Washington, and appeared in one game for the 1952 Boston Red Sox. Overall, Okrie appeared in 42 games, with 78 at bats, 17 hits, no home runs, three runs batted in, and a .218 batting average.

He managed in the Boston farm system from 1954 to 1960 and in 1963, and was the Red Sox' Major League bullpen coach in 1961–62 and 1965–66.  He then joined his hometown Detroit Tigers as a minor league manager (1967–69, 1971–74) and MLB bullpen coach (1970). His career record as a minor league manager was 912 wins, and 1,013 defeats (.474). Okrie won one league pennant, in the Appalachian League during his maiden season as a skipper.

His father, Frank, a left-handed pitcher, appeared in 21 games for the 1920 Tigers and two brothers played minor league baseball. Okrie died in April 2018 at the age of 94.

See also
List of second-generation Major League Baseball players

References

Johnson, Lloyd and Wolff, Miles, ed., The Encyclopedia of Minor League Baseball, 3rd edition. Durham, North Carolina: Baseball America, 2007.
Spink, C.C. Johnson, ed., The 1965 Baseball Register, The 1966 Baseball Register, The 1970 Baseball Register. St. Louis: The Sporting News.

External links

Nowlin, Bill, "Len Okrie."  Society for American Baseball Research Biography Project

 
 

1923 births
2018 deaths
Albany Senators players
American people of Polish descent
Baseball players from Detroit
Bluefield Blue-Grays players
Boston Red Sox coaches
Boston Red Sox players
Buffalo Bisons (minor league) players
Charlotte Hornets (baseball) players
Des Moines Bruins players
Detroit Tigers coaches
Fayetteville Cubs players
Greensboro Patriots players
Lakeland Flying Tigers managers
Lockport Cubs players
Lockport White Sox players
Louisville Colonels (minor league) players
Major League Baseball bullpen coaches
Major League Baseball catchers
San Diego Padres (minor league) players
Shelby Cubs players
Statesville Cubs players
Superior Blues players
Syracuse Chiefs players
United States Navy personnel of World War II
Washington Senators (1901–1960) players